The Daytime Emmy Award for Outstanding Entertainment News Program is an award presented annually by the National Academy of Television Arts and Sciences (NATAS) and Academy of Television Arts & Sciences (ATAS). It is given to honor a television newsmagazine  that covers "the entertainment industry with a focus on human interest, popular culture and celebrity gossip and interviews". Programs of this genre airing between the hours of 2:00 a.m. and 8:00 p.m. are eligible to enter.

This category additionally awards the work of the producer titles, segment producer(s), host(s), anchor(s) and correspondent(s) "credited on a minimum of 19% of the original episodes". At the 41st Daytime Emmy Awards held in 2014, Entertainment Tonight and  Extra were the first winners of this award when they tied in this category. The awards ceremony was not televised in 2014, and instead aired only online through the DaytimeEmmys.net website as there was an inability to find a proper TV broadcast channel.
The Emmy was named after an "Immy", an affectionate term used to refer to the image orthicon camera tube. The statuette was designed by Louis McManus, who modeled the award after his wife, Dorothy. The Emmy statuette is fifteen inches tall from base to tip. The statuette weighs 5 pounds and is composed of iron, pewter, zinc and gold.

Since its inception, the award has been given to two entertainment news program. Entertainment Tonight holds the record for the most awards, winning four occasions. This program also joins Access Hollywood and Extra for having the most nominations, with a total of five. As of the 2022 ceremony, Entertainment Tonight  became the most recent recipient of the award.

Winners and nominees
Listed below are the winners of the award for each year, as well as the other nominees.

2010s

Multiple wins
7 wins
Entertainment Tonight  
2 wins
Extra

Multiple nominations
9 nominations
Access Hollywood
Entertainment Tonight  
Extra 
5 nominations
E! News
Inside Edition
2 nominations
DailyMailTV
The Insider
TMZ

References

Daytime Emmy Awards
Awards established in 2014